Delaware County is the name of six counties in the United States:

 Delaware County, Indiana
 Delaware County, Iowa 
 Delaware County, New York
 Delaware County, Ohio
 Delaware County, Oklahoma
 Delaware County, Pennsylvania